Gelpi may refer to:
Gustavo Gelpí, United States Judge in Puerto Rico
Leandro Gelpi, Uruguayan footballer
Germán Gelpi, Argentine artist and designer
Christopher Gelpi, American historian
Albert Gelpi, professor of literature
Ricardo Gelpi